There have been seven baronetcies created for persons with the surname Edwards, three in the Baronetage of England and four in the Baronetage of the United Kingdom. Only one creation is extant as of 2007.

The Edwards Baronetcy, of Shrewsbury in the County of Shropshire, was created in the Baronetage of England on 21 March 1645. The second Baronet obtained a new creation in 1678. For more information on these creations, see Edwardes baronets.

The Edwards Baronetcy, of York in the County of York, was created in the Baronetage of England on 7 December 1691 for James Edwards. The title became extinct on the death of the third Baronet in 1764.

The Edwards Baronetcy, of Garth in the County of Montgomery, was created in the Baronetage of the United Kingdom in 1838 for John Edwards, Member of Parliament for Montgomery from 1833 to 1841. The title became extinct on his death in 1850.

The Edwards Baronetcy, of Pye Nest in the County of York, was created in the Baronetage of the United Kingdom on 3 August 1866 for Henry Edwards. He represented Halifax and Beverley in the House of Commons as a Conservative. He served as High Sheriff of Yorkshire in 1871.

The Edwards Baronetcy, of Knighton in the County of Radnor, was created in the Baronetage of the United Kingdom on 25 July 1907 for the Liberal politician Francis Edwards. The title became extinct on his death in 1928.

The Edwards Baronetcy, of Treforis in the County of Glamorgan, was created in the Baronetage of the United Kingdom on 30 June 1921 for John Bryn Edwards. The title became extinct on the death of his only son, the second Baronet, in 1999.

Edwards baronets, of Shrewsbury (1645)
see Edwardes baronets

Edwards baronets, of Shrewsbury (1678)
see Edwardes baronets

Edwards baronets, of York (1691)
Sir James Edwards, 1st Baronet (died 1702)
Sir James Edwards, 2nd Baronet (c. 1689–1744)
Sir Nathaniel Edwards, 3rd Baronet (c. 1699–1764)

Edwards baronets, of Garth (1838)
Sir John Edwards, 1st Baronet (died 1850)

Edwards baronets, of Pye Nest (1866)

Sir Henry Edwards, 1st Baronet (1812–1886)
Sir Henry Coster Lea Edwards, 2nd Baronet (1840–1896)
Sir John Henry Priestley Churchill Edwards, 3rd Baronet (1889–1942)
Sir Henry Charles Serrell Priestley Edwards, 4th Baronet (1893–1963)
Sir Christopher John Churchill Edwards, 5th Baronet (born 1941)

Edwards baronets, of Knighton (1907)
Sir Francis Edwards, 1st Baronet (1852–1927)

Edwards baronets, of Treforis (1921)
Sir John Bryn Edwards, 1st Baronet (1889–1922)
Sir John Clive Leighton Edwards, 2nd Baronet (1916–1999)

Notes

References
Kidd, Charles, Williamson, David (editors). Debrett's Peerage and Baronetage (1990 edition). New York: St Martin's Press, 1990.

External links
Biography of Sir John Edwards, 1st Baronet, of Garth, at Welsh Biography Online

Baronetcies in the Baronetage of the United Kingdom
Extinct baronetcies in the Baronetage of England
Extinct baronetcies in the Baronetage of the United Kingdom